Brett Shore is a former professional rugby league footballer who played in the 1980s.  He played for the Newcastle Knights in 1988.

Playing career
Shore was part of the Newcastle Knights inaugural year. He played 11 matches for the Knights before being released at the end of 1988 to pursue other interests.

References

External links
http://www.rugbyleagueproject.org/players/Brett_Shore/summary.html

Australian rugby league players
Newcastle Knights players
Living people
Year of birth missing (living people)
Place of birth missing (living people)
Rugby league props